Matabuena is a municipality located in the province of Segovia, Castile and León, Spain. According to the 2004 census (INE), the municipality has a population of 224 inhabitants.

History
Matabuena is a medieval village, which was called Mata Buena, which is to say it was a land rich in timber and good oak, Matamala neighborhood precisely the opposite, much ash (tree of poor quality).

Matabuena is one of the villages of the town of Pedraza.

References

Municipalities in the Province of Segovia